The following radio stations broadcast on FM frequency 89.5 MHz:

Argentina
 Amistad in La Verde, Chaco
 Ciudad in Coronel Pringles, Buenos Aires
 Ciudad in Lobería, Buenos Aires
 Cristal in Ingeniero Luiggi, La Pampa
 CNN Radio Rosario in Rosario, Santa Fe
 Ideas del Pueblo in Colonia Aldao, Santa Fe
 Municipal in General Rodriguez, Buenos Aires
 Nuevo horizonte in San Carlos, Corrientes
 Radio María in Ciudadela, Buenos Aires
 Radio María in Mayor Buratovich, Buenos Aires
 Radio María in General Cabrera, Córdoba
 Radio María in Pilar, Córdoba
 Radio María in Chamical, La Rioja
 Radio María in Cutral Có, Neuquén
 Radio María in El Bolsón, Río Negro
 Radio María in Río Colorado, Río Negro
 Radio María in Rosario de Lerma, Salta
 Rec in Moreno, Buenos Aires
 Reconquista in Jose Leon Suarez, Buenos Aires
 San Ramon in Goya, Corrientes
 Sol in Parana, Entre Rios
 Universo in Comodoro Rivadavia, Chubut
 Uno in Paso de los Libres, Corrientes
 Urbana in Buenos Aires
 Visión Formosa in Formosa

Australia
 Valley FM 89.5 Tuggeranong in Tuggeranong, Australian Capital Territory
 ABC Classic FM in Goulburn, New South Wales
 Triple J in Sunshine Coast, Queensland
 3PNN in Bendigo, Victoria
 SBS Radio in Wodonga, Victoria

Canada (Channel 208)
 CBHN-FM in New Glasgow, Nova Scotia
 CBPJ-FM in Waterton Park, Alberta
 CBSM-FM in Sault Ste. Marie, Ontario
 CBUD-FM in Bonnington Falls, British Columbia
 CBYP-FM in Portland Creek, Newfoundland and Labrador
 CFGB-FM in Goose Bay, Newfoundland and Labrador
 CHWK-FM in Chilliwack, British Columbia
 CIUT-FM in Toronto, Ontario
 CJBR-FM-1 in Riviere-du-Loup, Quebec
 CJRL-FM in Kenora, Ontario
 CJSE-FM in Shediac, New Brunswick
 CKWG-FM in Wahgoshig Lake, Ontario

China 
 CNR Business Radio in Yongzhou
 CNR Kazakh Radio in Xinjiang
 CNR The Voice of China in Putian

Costa Rica
 LIFE 895 FM in Curridabat, San José

Malaysia
 Buletin FM in Kota Kinabalu, Sabah (Coming Soon)

Mexico
 XHBON-FM in Guadalajara, Jalisco
 XHCG-FM in Nogales, Sonora
 XHCSI-FM in Culiacán, Sinaloa
 XHFTI-FM in Fortín, Veracruz
 XHME-FM in Puerto Vallarta, Jalisco
 XHNAL-FM in Tonalá, Chiapas
 XHRCL-FM in San Luis Río Colorado, Sonora
 XHRRR-FM in Encarnación de Díaz, Jalisco
 XHRV-FM in Valle Hermoso, Tamaulipas
 XHSAB-FM in Sabinas Hidalgo, Nuevo León
 XHUAQ-FM in Querétaro, Querétaro
 XHUCT-FM in Torreón, Coahuila

Philippines
DWIM-FM in Baguio
DWSB-FM in Subic Bay Freeport Zone, Olongapo
DZTR in Naga, Camarines Sur
DYQN in Iloilo City
DXYM in General Santos
DWEG in Lipa

Taiwan 
 Transfers CNR The Voice of China in Central Taiwan, mainly Kinmen

Thailand
 Live 89.5 Radio

United States (Channel 208)
 KACU in Abilene, Texas
  in Ephraim, Utah
 KAIB in Shafter, California
  in Phoenix, Arizona
  in Ceres, California
  in Heber Springs, Arkansas
  in Odessa, Texas
 KBPG (FM) in Montevideo, Minnesota
 KCAC (FM) in Camden, Arkansas
  in Ferguson, Missouri
 KCJA in Conway, Iowa
 KCKJ in Sarcoxie, Missouri
 KCNP in Ada, Oklahoma
 KDCB in Coos Bay, Oregon
 KDKO in Lake Andes, South Dakota
  in North Powder, Oregon
  in Portales, New Mexico
 KEPX in Eagle Pass, Texas
 KEQX in Stephenville, Texas
  in Cheney, Washington
 KFAA in Horace, North Dakota
  in Salina, Kansas
  in Cedar Falls, Iowa
 KICO in Rico, Colorado
 KITA in Iota, Louisiana
 KJAI in Ojai, California
  in Carnegie, Oklahoma
  in Longview, Washington
  in Drake, Arizona
  in El Paso, Texas
 KLAP in Gerlach, Nevada
  in Decorah, Iowa
 KLFG in Fort Dodge, Iowa
  in Little Eagle, South Dakota
  in Rigby, Idaho
 KLUX in Robstown, Texas
 KLXD in Victorville, California
 KMFA in Austin, Texas
 KMGS in Anvik, Alaska
 KMOC in Wichita Falls, Texas
 KNCJ in Reno, Nevada
 KNHC in Seattle, Washington
 KNIB in Nikolai, Alaska
  in Cedar Hill, Missouri
  in Poplar Bluff, Missouri
  in Columbia, Missouri
  in San Diego, California
  in Pine Grove, Oregon
 KPJH in Polson, Montana
  in San Francisco, California
  in Williston, North Dakota
 KPRA in Ukiah, California
  in Grand Junction, Colorado
 KQAL in Winona, Minnesota
 KQSI-LP in Sidney, Nebraska
 KRCI in Pinetop-Lakeside, Arizona
 KSKC in Crooked Creek, Alaska
 KSKO-FM in McGrath, Alaska
 KSKP in Sleetmute, Alaska
 KSKQ in Ashland, Oregon
  in Moraga, California
  in Wapato, Washington
  in Tillamook, Oregon
  in Dolores, Colorado
  in Klamath Falls, Oregon
 KTKF in Tok, Alaska
 KTME in Reliance, Wyoming
 KTOT in Spearman, Texas
  in Pueblo, Colorado
  in Caldwell, Idaho
  in Logan, Utah
 KVBE-LP in Portland, Oregon
  in Socorro, New Mexico
 KVMR in Nevada City, California
 KVNE in Tyler, Texas
 KVRF in Sutton, Alaska
 KVSJ-FM in Tracy, California
 KVUD in Bay City, Texas
 KWCC-FM in Woodland Park, Colorado
  in Tulsa, Oklahoma
  in Ethete, Wyoming
  in Monroe, Louisiana
 KYPF in Stanford, Montana
 KYQX in Weatherford, Texas
 KZCT in Vallejo, California
  in Auburn Heights, Michigan
 WAWN in Franklin, Pennsylvania
 WAYJ in Naples, Florida
  in Archbold, Ohio
 WBEW in Chesterton, Indiana
  in Birmingham, Alabama
 WBSB (FM) in Anderson, Indiana
 WCLQ in Wausau, Wisconsin
  in Mount Pleasant, Michigan
 WCNP in Baraboo, Wisconsin
  in Arcade, New York
  in Belpre, Ohio
  in Dayton, Ohio
 WDTP in Huron Township, Michigan
  in Effingham, Illinois
 WEOS in Geneva, New York
  in Johnson City, Tennessee
  in Melbourne, Florida
 WFOT in Lexington, Ohio
 WGRN in Greenville, Illinois
  in Mayo, Florida
  in Dothan, Alabama
  in Norfolk, Virginia
  in Hamilton, Ohio
 WHVY in Coshocton, Ohio
 WILB-FM in Boardman, Ohio
  in Harrisburg, Pennsylvania
 WIUW in Warsaw, Illinois
 WJHW in Mayodan, North Carolina
 WJMU in Decatur, Illinois
 WJRF in Duluth, Minnesota
 WKMT (FM) in Fulton, Kentucky
 WKPB in Henderson, Kentucky
 WLJV in Spotsylvania, Virginia
 WLPS-FM in Lumberton, North Carolina
 WMAE-FM in Booneville, Mississippi
 WMFV in Cedar Creek, Florida
 WMIH in Geneva, Ohio
 WMOT in Murfreesboro, Tennessee
 WNCK in Nantucket, Massachusetts
 WNGU in Dahlonega, Georgia
 WNIJ in DeKalb, Illinois
 WNNU in Great Barrington, Massachusetts
 WNTE in Mansfield, Pennsylvania
 WOFR in Schoolcraft, Michigan
 WOVI in Novi, Michigan
 WPCS (FM) in Pensacola, Florida
 WPKN in Bridgeport, Connecticut
 WPRG in Columbia, Mississippi
 WQAI in Thomson, Georgia
 WQRP in Dayton, Ohio
 WRNF in Selma, Alabama
 WSCL in Salisbury, Maryland
 WSKB in Westfield, Massachusetts
 WSLU in Canton, New York
 WSOM in Franklin, Indiana
 WSOU in South Orange, New Jersey
 WSPI in Ellsworth, Illinois
 WTJY in Asheboro, North Carolina
 WUNY in Utica, New York
 WUUA in Glen Spey, New York
 WVDS in Petersburg, West Virginia
 WVMS (FM) in Sandusky, Ohio
 WVPR in Windsor, Vermont
 WWPJ in Pen Argyl, Pennsylvania
 WWTP in Augusta, Maine
 WYAZ in Yazoo City, Mississippi
 WYFK in Columbus, Georgia
 WYFS in Savannah, Georgia
 WYFW in Winder, Georgia
 WYNJ in Blackduck, Minnesota
 WYPA in Cherry Hill, New Jersey
 WZWP in West Union, Ohio

References 

Lists of radio stations by frequency